Garikoitz 'Gari' Uranga Luluaga (born 21 June 1980) is a Spanish former footballer. Usually a left winger, he could also operate as a forward.

Club career
Uranga was born in Tolosa, Gipuzkoa. A product of Basque Country giants Real Sociedad's youth system, he played one game for its first team in 2001–02's La Liga then spent two seasons on loan in the second division, being instrumental to Getafe CF's first ever top-flight promotion.

Over the next four seasons after his return, Uranga would be regularly used by Real Sociedad, for instance going through 33 scoreless matches in 2005–06 and missing several months the following campaign, which ended in relegation after 40 years, due to a knee injury. His father Luis was also club president during that period.

After his contract expired, Uranga signed a two-year deal with CD Castellón also in the second tier. He retired in June 2010 at only 30 after the Valencian Community side suffered relegation, having made 225 appearances at the professional level in an eight-year career (22 goals).

References

External links

1980 births
Living people
People from Tolosa, Spain
Spanish footballers
Footballers from the Basque Country (autonomous community)
Association football wingers
La Liga players
Segunda División players
Segunda División B players
Tercera División players
Real Sociedad B footballers
Real Sociedad footballers
SD Eibar footballers
Getafe CF footballers
CD Castellón footballers
Basque Country international footballers